Streptomyces yanii is a bacterium species from the genus of Streptomyces which has been isolated from mud.

See also 
 List of Streptomyces species

References

Further reading

External links
Type strain of Streptomyces yanii at BacDive – the Bacterial Diversity Metadatabase

yanii
Bacteria described in 2005